George Fayerweather III (1802– 13 November 1869) was a blacksmith and activist for abolitionism.  He was of mixed Narragansett and African Ancestry from South Kingstown, Rhode Island.

Early life and education
Fayerweather was born to George Fayerweather, a blacksmith who built the 1820 Fayerweather homestead, and a Narragansett woman who was the descendant of a sachem. His father was descended from slaves freed after the American Revolutionary War.

Work
Like their father, Fayerweather and his brother Solomon took up blacksmithing as a skilled trade, as did several of their descendants. It was a key position in a 19th-century village.

Fayerweather moved to Canterbury, Connecticut, where in 1833 he married Sarah Harris (1812–1878), a free black woman born in Norwich, Connecticut, to free parents.  She was the first African-American girl admitted to Prudence Crandall’s school in Canterbury.  Several parents took their daughters out of the school, and it was closed under the notorious Connecticut Black Law of 1833.

Fayerweather and his family moved to Kingston in 1855 to the Fayerweather homestead; he followed his father and brother Solomon as the village blacksmith.  Their residence became a center of anti-slavery activity in the community, and they entertained numerous famous abolitionists in their home.

Fayerwether died on 13 November 1869 in Kingston, and was buried at Old Fernwood Cemetery.

External links
 Guide to the Fayerweather Family Papers, University of Rhode Island

References

People from South Kingstown, Rhode Island
1802 births
1869 deaths
People from Washington County, Rhode Island
History of Rhode Island
African-American abolitionists